Palm Beach Water Airport  is a water aerodrome used by seaplanes. It is located in the suburb of Palm Beach, Sydney, New South Wales, Australia.

Airlines
 Palm Beach Seaplanes
 Sydney By Seaplane

See also
 List of airports in Greater Sydney
 List of airports in New South Wales

External links
 LBH at Great Circle

Airports in New South Wales
Airports in Greater Sydney
Seaplane bases
Transport in Sydney
Water aerodromes
Palm Beach, New South Wales